Red Hood vs. Anarky is a 2018 comic book one-shot published by DC Comics. The comic depicts the character Anarky trying to crash Selina Kyle's bachelorette party all the while Jason Todd (Red Hood) is running security. It was written by Tim Seeley and illustrated by Javi Fernandez.

Publication history
The one-shot is part of a line named Batman: Prelude to the Wedding which were made to build up the wedding of Batman and Catwoman. It was published along with Robin vs. Ra's al Ghul, Nightwing vs. Hush, Batgirl vs. the Riddler and Harley Quinn vs. the Joker.

Seely expressed that he decided to pair up Red Hood and Anarky because he feels that they are similar characters, where he said: "To me, what made that interesting is that Red Hood is the bad seed of the family, to some degree. And I can play that against Anarky, who in some ways, could be a fallen member of the Bat family. The way that James [Tynion] played Anarky in Detective Comics is he shared a lot of the same goals and motivations with the [Gotham Knights] team, but he's also a guy who has a tendency to run afoul of Batman's beliefs". He wanted Fernandez for the art because he believed that Fernandez was capable of a darker style that fit his story.

Plot

Reception
The series holds an average rating of 7.5 by 19 professional critics on review aggregation website Comic Book Roundup.

See also
 List of Batman comics
 List of DC Comics publications
 Publication history of Anarky

References

DC Comics one-shots
Red Hood titles
2018 comics debuts
2018 comics endings
Anarky